Podgrivye is a rural locality (a village) in Kichmegnskoye Rural Settlement, Kichmengsko-Gorodetsky District, Vologda Oblast, Russia. The population was 37 as of 2002.

Geography 
Podgrivye is located 33 km northeast of Kichmengsky Gorodok (the district's administrative centre) by road. Kilchenga is the nearest rural locality.

References 

Rural localities in Kichmengsko-Gorodetsky District